Grammodes boisdeffrii is a moth of the family Noctuidae first described by Charles Oberthür in 1867. It is found from the northern and western parts of the Sahara to Egypt, Israel and Lebanon.

There are multiple generations per year. Adults are on wing year round.

Subspecies
Grammodes boisdeffrii boisdeffrii
Grammodes boisdeffrii palaestinensis

External links

Image

Ophiusina
Moths of the Middle East
Moths described in 1867